In Greek mythology, Glaucus (Ancient Greek: Γλαῦκος Glaukos means "shiny", "bright" or "bluish-green") was a captain in the Lycian army under the command of his close friend and cousin Sarpedon. The Lycians in the Trojan War were allies of Troy. During the war Glaucus fought valiantly. He was described by the chronicler Malalas in his account of the Chronography as "  strong, sensible, pious".

Family 
Glaucus was a son of Hippolokhos and a grandson of the hero Bellerophon.

Mythology 
In the Iliad, he met Diomedes in the field of battle in face to face combat. In response to Diomedes' challenge to him, Glaucus said that as a grandson of Bellerophon, he would fight anybody. Upon learning of Glaucus' ancestry, Diomedes planted his spear in the ground and told of how his grandfather Oeneus was a close friend of Bellerophon, and declared that the two of them despite being on opposing sides should continue the friendship. As a sign of friendship, Diomedes took off his bronze armor worth nine oxen and gave it to Glaucus. The latter then had his wits taken by Zeus and gave Diomedes his golden armor, said to be worth 100 oxen.  

Glaucus was in the division of Sarpedon and Asteropaios when the Trojans assaulted the Greek wall. Their division fought valiantly, allowing Hector to break through the wall. During this assault, Teucer shot Glaucus with an arrow, wounding him and forcing him to withdraw from combat. Later, upon seeing Sarpedon mortally wounded, Glaucus prayed to Apollo, asking him to help him to rescue the body of his dying friend. Apollo cured his wound, allowing Glaucus to rally the Trojans around the body of Sarpedon until the gods carried the body away. Later in the war, when the fighting over Achilles' corpse took place, Glaucus was killed by Ajax. His body, however, was rescued by Aeneas and was then taken by Apollo to Lycia for funeral rites.

Notes

References 
 Apollodorus, The Library with an English Translation by Sir James George Frazer, F.B.A., F.R.S. in 2 Volumes, Cambridge, MA, Harvard University Press; London, William Heinemann Ltd. 1921. ISBN 0-674-99135-4. Online version at the Perseus Digital Library. Greek text available from the same website.
Gaius Julius Hyginus, Fabulae from The Myths of Hyginus translated and edited by Mary Grant. University of Kansas Publications in Humanistic Studies. Online version at the Topos Text Project.
 Homer, The Iliad with an English Translation by A.T. Murray, Ph.D. in two volumes. Cambridge, MA., Harvard University Press; London, William Heinemann, Ltd. 1924. Online version at the Perseus Digital Library.
 Homer, Homeri Opera in five volumes. Oxford, Oxford University Press. 1920. Greek text available at the Perseus Digital Library.
 Quintus Smyrnaeus, The Fall of Troy (or Posthomerica). Translated by Way. A. S. Loeb. Classical Library Volume 19. London: William Heinemann, 1913. Online version at the Theoi Classical Texts Library.

Trojan Leaders
Lycians
Characters in the Iliad
Characters in Book VI of the Aeneid
Lycia